The Long March 3C, also known as the Changzheng 3C, CZ-3C and LM-3C, is a Chinese orbital launch vehicle. It is launched from Launch Complex 2 and 3 at the Xichang Satellite Launch Center (XSLC). A three-stage rocket with two strapon liquid rocket boosters, it is a member of the Long March 3 rocket family, and was derived from the Long March 3B. It was designed to fill a gap in payload capacities between the Long March 3A and 3B.

Launch Statistics

Launches 
It made its maiden flight on 25 April 2008, at 15:35 UTC. The payload for the first launch was the Tianlian I-01 data relay communications satellite. The second carried the Compass-G2 navigation satellite and was conducted on 14 April 2009. The third launch was made on 16 January 2010, with the Compass-G1 satellite. The fourth carrying the Compass-G3 navigation satellite was launched on 2 June 2010. On 1 October 2010, it successfully launched China's second lunar probe, Chang'e 2.

An enhanced version, named Long March 3C/E, debuted during the launch of Chang'e 5-T1 on 23 October 2014. On 30 March 2015, the Yuanzheng upper stage was used on top of a Long March 3C launch vehicle for the first time.

List of launches

References 

Long March (rocket family)
Vehicles introduced in 2008